This is a list of electoral results for the Electoral district of Swan in Western Australian state elections.

Members for Swan

Election results

Elections in the 1980s 

 Preferences were not distributed.

Elections in the 1970s

Elections in the 1960s

Elections in the 1940s 

 Swan was won in a by-election by Independent candidate Ray Owen upon the death of sitting Country member Richard Sampson.

Elections in the 1930s 

 Richard Sampson was the sitting member for Swan that changed from the Nationalist to the Country party for this election.

Elections in the 1920s

Elections in the 1910s 

 Nairn's designation at the 1914 election was simply "Liberal", rather than "National Liberal".

Elections in the 1900s

Elections in the 1890s

References

Western Australian state electoral results by district